Jannik Sinner defeated Maxime Cressy in the final, 7–6(7–3), 6–3 to win the singles tennis title at the 2023 Open Sud de France.

Alexander Bublik was the defending champion, but lost in the first round to Grégoire Barrère.

Seeds 
The top four seeds received a bye into the second round.

Draw

Finals

Top half

Bottom half

Qualifying

Seeds

Qualifiers

Qualifying draw

First qualifier

Second qualifier

Third qualifier

Fourth qualifier

References

External links
 Main draw
 Qualifying draw

Singles
2023 ATP Tour